George Anthony "Boomer" Walkem (November 15, 1834 – January 13, 1908) was a British Columbian politician and jurist.

Life and career
Born in Newry, Ireland, Walkem moved to then Colony of British Columbia in 1862 and served as a member of the Colonial Assembly (Cariboo East and Quesnel Forks District) from 1864 to 1866 and the appointed Legislative Council (Cariboo) from 1866 to 1870. He was a supporter of Canadian Confederation. With the admission of the colony into Canada, Walkem was elected to the provincial legislature from the riding of Cariboo in 1871 and became attorney general in the cabinet of Premier Amor De Cosmos and succeeded him to become the third premier of British Columbia.

Walkem's government pressured Ottawa to meet its commitment to build a railway to the Pacific Ocean but was initially unsuccessful. Walkem fought the 1875 election facing charges that he had failed to secure railway construction and had increased the province's debts by engaging in expensive public works projects. The government was re-elected with a reduced majority but he was also accused of plunging the province into debt by engaging in public works that it could ill afford (see Lillooet Cattle Trail).  Nevertheless, his government was returned, albeit with a reduced majority but grievances continued.

The Walkem government's financial difficulties mounted and his government lost a Motion of No Confidence in early 1876 and was replaced by a new government formed by Andrew Charles Elliott with Walkem becoming Leader of the Opposition. Elliot's government was unstable and collapsed within two years leading to early elections which allowed Walkem to form a second government in 1878 as the fifth premier, with a comfortable majority.

The new Walkem government opposed "cheap Chinese labour" and inserted a clause banning the hiring of Chinese workers in all its contracts. The government also attempted to levy a special tax restricted to Chinese which was struck down by the Supreme Court of Canada. In the election campaign Walkem had threatened to lead British Columbia out of confederation if the federal government did not commence construction of the promised railway by 1879. The provincial government appealed directly to London resulting in the British government pressuring Ottawa to fulfill the deal.

In 1882 Walkem narrowly survived a Motion of No Confidence due to rising costs of a project to build a dock on Vancouver Island but lost the subsequent election due to hostility from Islanders who had a disproportionate number of seats in the legislature and thus were able to bring down the Walkem government.

Walkem was appointed to the Supreme Court of British Columbia upon retiring from politics in 1882, sitting on the court until his retirement in 1904.

George Anthony Walkem is interred in the Ross Bay Cemetery in Victoria, British Columbia.

References 
 

Irish emigrants to pre-Confederation British Columbia
Attorneys General of British Columbia
Canadian Anglicans
Premiers of British Columbia
Members of the Colonial Assembly of British Columbia
Politicians from County Down
People from Newry
1834 births
1908 deaths
Members of the Legislative Council of British Columbia